The Car Show is an Australian lifestyle television program hosted by Glenn Ridge, who is also Executive Producer. The Car Show features stories about motoring, from people who are passionate about their cars, to scenic drives, restoration projects, manufacturer profiles and road tests of the latest release vehicles from local and international car manufacturers. Presenters include Steven Jacobs and Bridget McIntyre. It began screening in 2003 on the Nine Network.

References

See also
 List of Australian television series
 List of Nine Network programs

Australian non-fiction television series
Nine Network original programming
2003 Australian television series debuts
Conservation and restoration of vehicles